Ralls may refer to:

Surname
Joe Ralls (born 1993), English professional footballer
John Perkins Ralls (1822–1904), physician and Alabama representative during the American Civil War
Katherine Ralls (born 1939), American zoologist/conservationist at the Smithsonian Institution
Scott Ralls, the president of Northern Virginia Community College

Given name
William Ralls Morrison (1824–1909), U.S. Representative from Illinois

Places
Ralls County, Missouri, county located in the northeastern portion of the U.S. state of Missouri
Ralls, Texas, city in Crosby County, Texas, United States

Other
Ralls Janet (apple), apple cultivar that is also known by many other names

See also
Rall
Rallis
Rallus